SOKO Rhein-Main is a German police procedural television series that premiered on 19 April 2006 on ZDF. The series aired for two seasons and was discontinued in 2008. It is the seventh offshoot of SOKO München, launched in 1978. "SOKO" is an abbreviation of the German word Sonderkommission, which means "special investigative team". The story is set in the region of Rhenish Hesse, focusing on the city of Frankfurt.

Due to differences from other shows in the SOKO franchise, the first season of SOKO Rhein-Main was titled Die Spezialisten: Kripo Rhein-Main (The Specialists: Criminal Police Rhein-Main), and the SOKO moniker was adopted in the second season and later retained for reruns.

Cast and characters

See also
 List of German television series

External links
 
 SOKO Rhein-Main on ZDF (archived)

2006 German television series debuts
2008 German television series endings
German crime television series
2000s German police procedural television series
Television shows set in Frankfurt
German television spin-offs
German-language television shows
ZDF original programming